Kartikay Saini (born 21 February 1964) is an Indian administrator who was Chairman of the Board of Directors for Special Olympics Bharat, the national Special Olympics Program for India.

Saini is an Ex-Naval commander who served the Indian Navy for 15 long years and then switched to the corporate world. He is an alumnus of Sacred Heart Convent School in Ludhiana and the National Defence Academy in Khadakwasla, Pune.

Achievements 

 The first Indian to be the Chairman of Asia Pacific Unified Sports, overseeing 30 countries.
 The first Indian to be on the Board of Special Olympics International Washington.
 Education Stalwarts 2022

References 

Living people
Indian sports executives and administrators
1967 births